Mostafa Alnagar / Mostafa Alnajjarمصطفي النجار ; (born 5 May 1980 in Cairo, Egypt) is an Egyptian opposition figure and politician, and a writer, with a special interest in human rights.

Involvement in the Egyptian Revolution of 2011-esqat alnezam 
Mostafa Alnagar is one of the iconic figures of the 25 January 2011 Revolution,

Mostafa Alnagar's name was specifically related Wael Ghonim in setting the flare of public rebellion against the regime( esqat alnezam). He wrote a" letter" to "The president" explaining why was the date 25 January chosen for the revolution, which was published on  Aldostor Alasly newspaper then removed after being copied by several newspapers and blogs and re-published by Alyom7 a year later . The date 25 January had been announced earlier through a Facebook page titled, "We Are All Khaled Said," supporting Khaled Said, a young Egyptian who was tortured to death by police in Alexandria. Whose admin was Wael Ghonim that used this page in moving and integrating the anti-government protests of the 25th of Jan revolution. He first made an announcement on the page on 14 January, asking members if they were going to plan on taking to the streets on 25 January and do what Tunisia did? In less than 2 hours he published an event entitled: 25 يناير على التعذيب والفساد والظلم والبطالة [January 25: Revolution against Torture, Corruption, Unemployment and Injustice]. This was the first invitation and many others followed. He anonymously collaborated with activists on the ground to announce the locations for the protest. "Mostafa Alnagar was the only one who knew I was the admin of Khaled Saed page", Ghoneim says.

Education 
Mostafa Alnagar received his bachelor's degree in dentistry from AlAzhar University and then went on to study mass communication at the American University in Cairo (AUC). He also worked as a researcher on a project documenting social movements carried out by the political science department at AUC.

Political activities 
Mostafa's grandfather, Kamal Abdel Tawab, was a leading MB figure. Mostafa himself joined the movement's youth wing but left the organization in 2005, when he felt he "no longer identified with its platform and ideology".
Since 2007, Mostafa Alnagar has been actively blogging and writing extensively about human rights.

He was co-ordinator for the Arab Journalists and Bloggers Network for Human Rights.

Mostafa was arrested three times: in 2000 before the parliamentary elections; in 2003 for his involvement in the protests against the Iraq war; in January 2010, after the Nag` Hammadi incident. He had gone with other delegates to Nag` Hammadi to offer his condolences to the families of those who were shot to death outside a church at the time of the Christmas mass. He and his colleagues were accused of threatening national unity and igniting sectarian strife. 
  
He was one of the doctors who traveled to Gaza after the siege in 2009, where he simultaneously treated people and reported the events as they unfolded.

In 2010, he became coordinator of ElBaradei's National Association for Change Campaign, "a coalition of opposition figures and groups formed in 2010 to demand democratic reforms as well as free and fair presidential elections in which independent candidates that were not handpicked by the Mubarak regime could run.".

After January 25, 2011 
Mostafa Alnagar actively urged people to join the January 25, 2011, protest. Consequently, he was arrested for the fourth time on the night of January 25, 2011. He was released shortly after.

TV hostess Muna Al-Shazli featured Mostafa on her show during the earlier days of the Revolution, and Mostafa tried to give people at home a sense of what protesters were going through. Mostafa recounted that he was standing alongside a young man in front of the Egyptian Museum, which is very close to Tahrir Square. The young man, Ahmed, asked him if it were possible that the police would fire bullets at them; "They're Egyptian like us, right"? he asked. Mostafa reassured him that they would not fire. That night, a bullet killed Ahmed. As the protesters rushed him to one of the makeshift hospitals in an attempt to save him, Ahmed asked Mostafa, "Are we right?" Mostafa told him, "Yes, we are." And with that, he died. So, Mostafa said, on air, "To Ahmed and to all the martyrs, I am telling you now: we are on the right track, and we will be victorious."
In June 2011, Mostafa cofounded al-Adl Party, which "seeks to carve for itself a centrist position in Egypt’s post-revolution political landscape away from the ideological spats dividing secular and Islamist trends."

In August 2011, when bed-ridden Mubarak's trial first began, Mostafa called the trial "a moment no Egyptian ever thought was possible". He said he felt that the moment was "a real success for the revolution" and believed that "the moment of real retribution is near".
In November 2011, Mostafa ran for a seat in parliament and won against his opponent, a Salafi who was backed by the Salafist party al-Nour and the Muslim Brotherhood's party al-Hurriyya wal-Adala (Freedom and Justice). Very few people thought he would win against such a well-funded opponent. But Mostafa won by a landslide in the runoff. He said that there was a huge smear campaign against him during the elections, that people in mosques would actually campaign against him, questioning his faith and telling the "impressionable, less fortunate people" that he was not Muslim. Alnagar continued advocating democracy, human rights and the rights of the Coptic minority during the reign of the Muslim Brotherhood that he was dubbed by some extremists as the 'church's candidate'

Mostafa was the only member of Al-Adl party to win a seat in parliament.

In mid-June 2012, Egypt's Supreme Court dissolved the elected parliament, on grounds that "one third of the parliament had been elected illegally and that the whole body therefore had to be dissolved."

Awards 
He won an honorary award from the United Nations Human Rights Council in Beirut in 2010 for his blog Ana Ma`ahum (I am with them).

Defamation and Imprisonment

As part of the SCAF state crackdown on all opposition figures,  all activists have been grouped with the currently unpopular MB members. Alnagar - together with other 2011 revolution figure, was subject to moral and character assassination through a media campaign led by a journalist called Abdel Rahim Ali who aired a series of allegedly leaked personal phone calls in a defamation campaign known as 'Ali's Leaks'. The allegedly leaked recordings - which were allegedly recorded during breaking into the State Security building in Cairo and 'stealing' the surveillance files of Egyptian citizens, were said to have been 'edited and taken out of context'. thus never resulted in the prosecution of the activists involved in what would have otherwise been a 'treason' crime. Instead, Alnagar - together with another 17 in addition to the toppled MB president Mohammed Morsi, were sentenced to three years in prison on 30 December 2017 for ′insulting the judiciary system . Naggar has been missing since the 28th of September 2018.Last contact had been made with him that day, however since his disappearance government officials have not given any precise information to where he is kept or might have been taken or killed. days

See also
 Justice Party (Egypt)

References

External links 
 "Al-Adl". Ahram Online and Jadaliyya. December 1, 2011.  Accessed May 7, 2012.
 Afify, Heba. "Ahead of revolution anniversary, disagreements over power transfer". Egypt Independent. January 10, 2012.  Accessed April 28, 2012.
 "Egypt's Opposition Calls for 1 Million on Streets". Associated Press.  January 31, 2011. Accessed April 28, 2012.
 El Deeb, Sarah. "On eve of Egypt's election, a revolution reboot." Associated Press. November 26, 2011. Accessed April 28, 2012.
 Fahmy, Heba. "MB, Baradei campaign members cite threats ahead of Jan. 25 protests". Daily News Egypt. January 24, 2011. Accessed April 27, 2012.
 Gharib, Muhammad. "Hazima lil-Ikhwan fi Madinat Nasr: al-Naggar Yafuz bi-Maq`ad al-Fi'at wa Uda bil-Amal." Al-Masry al-Youm. December 7, 2011.  Accessed April 28, 2012.
 Hidiyya, Sha`ban. "Shabab al-Ikhwan Yattahimun 'Al-Muhafithin' bil-Isa'a lil-Irian." Al-Youm al-Sabi`. November 5, 2009.  Accessed April 28, 2012.
 Michael, Maggie. "Egyptians protest rights lawyer's arrest in Saudi Arabia, case fuels longtime resentment". Associated Press. April 24, 2012. Accessed May 1, 2012.

 Al-Adl official website
 Alnagar's Facebook page
 Mostafa Alnagar's official website
 Twitter  account

Living people
1980 births
Cairo University alumni
The American University in Cairo alumni
Egyptian politicians